Sheldon Maurice Reynolds (born September 13, 1959) is an American guitarist, singer, and songwriter. Reynolds is a former member of bands Sun, The Commodores and Earth, Wind & Fire.

Career

Born in Cincinnati, Ohio, Reynolds began playing the guitar when he was eight years old, and by the age of 12 was considered a prodigy. He went on to become an alumnus of The University of Cincinnati. Reynolds eventually embarked upon a professional musical career. At first he toured with singer Millie Jackson. Reynolds later joined R&B band Sun, with whom he recorded three albums. During 1983 he became a member of The Commodores. With the Commodores he sang on their 1985 LP Nightshift and then played on their 1986 album United. Altogether he featured with the band for four years.

Reynolds then joined Earth, Wind, & Fire (EWF) in the roles of lead guitarist and co-vocalist. He went on to play on EWF's LPs Touch The World (1987), The Best of Earth, Wind & Fire, Vol. 2 (1988), Heritage (1990), Millennium (1993) and In The Name of Love (1997). With EWF he earned a Grammy nomination in 1994 in the category of Best R&B Performance by a Duo or Group with Vocals for the song "Sunday Morning". As a member of the band, Reynolds was inducted into the NAACP Image Award Hall of Fame.

Solo work
Reynolds played on Maurice White's 1985 self-titled album and Philip Bailey's 1989 LP Family Affair. He later guested on Barbara Weathers's 1990 self-titled album, Smokey Robinson's 1990 LP Love, Smokey and Joey Lawrence's 1993 self-titled album. Reynolds also performed on 4Him's 1994 LP The Ride and Take 6's 1996 album Brothers.

He later appeared on jazz group Urban Knights 1997 LP Urban Knights II and on Alfonzo Blackwell's 1998 album Body of Soul. Reynolds also featured on Chicago's 2008 LP Chicago XXXII: Stone of Sisyphus, Brian Culbertson's 2008 album Bringing Back The Funk and on Culbertson's 2010 release XII.

Personal life
Reynolds is a contributing editor to the magazine Astronomy. He also has a talk show on Twilight Radio.

He was formerly married to Janie Hendrix, the adopted sister of Jimi Hendrix.

References

1959 births
Living people
20th-century American guitarists
21st-century American guitarists
American funk guitarists
American male guitarists
American rhythm and blues guitarists
Musicians from Cincinnati
Commodores members
Earth, Wind & Fire members
Guitarists from Ohio
University of Cincinnati alumni
20th-century American male musicians
21st-century American male musicians